A dehalogenase is a type of enzyme that catalyzes the removal of a halogen atom from a substrate.

Examples include:

Reductive dehalogenases
4-chlorobenzoate dehalogenase
 4-chlorobenzoyl-CoA dehalogenase
 Dichloromethane dehalogenase
 Fluoroacetate dehydrogenase
 Haloacetate dehalogenase
 (R)-2-haloacid dehalogenase
 (S)-2-haloacid dehalogenase
 Haloalkane dehalogenase
 Halohydrin dehalogenase
 Haloacetate dehalogenase
 Tetrachloroethene reductive dehalogenase

References